Group B of the 2001 Fed Cup Americas Zone Group II was one of four pools in the Americas Zone Group II of the 2001 Fed Cup. Three teams competed in a round robin competition, with each team being assigned to its respective play-off region.

Bahamas vs. Trinidad and Tobago

Bahamas vs. Chile

Chile vs. Trinidad and Tobago

See also
Fed Cup structure

References

External links
 Fed Cup website

2001 Fed Cup Americas Zone